A. nitida may refer to:
 Agrochola nitida, a moth species found in most of Europe
 Anisophyllea nitida, a plant species
 Avicennia nitida, the black mangrove, a tree species
 Axinaea nitida, a plant species

See also 
 Nitida (disambiguation)